Hypsioma steinbachi is a species of beetle in the family Cerambycidae. It was described by Dillon and Dillon in 1945. It is known from Bolivia and Brazil.

References

steinbachi
Beetles described in 1945